S18 may refer to:

Aviation 
 Forks Airport, in Clallam County, Washington, United States
 Letov Š-18, a Czechoslovak biplane trainer
 Rans S-18 Stinger II, an American ultralight
 Saab 18, a Swedish bomber and reconnaissance aircraft
 Sikorsky S-18, a Russian biplane
 Spalinger S.18, a Swiss sailplane
 Thorp S-18, an American homebuilt aircraft

Rail and transit 
 Forch railway, a line of the Zürich S-Bahn
 Ichinoe Station, in Edogawa, Tokyo, Japan
 Iyo-Ōzu Station, in Ōzu, Ehime Prefecture, Japan
 Naruko Kita Station, in Tempaku-ku, Nagoya, Aichi Prefecture, Japan
 Tanimachi Kyūchōme Station, in Ikutamamaemachi, Tennōji-ku, Osaka, Japan
 Yoichi Station, in Yoichi, Hokkaido, Japan

Vessels 
 , a submarine of the Royal Navy
 , a torpedo boat of the Imperial German Navy
 , a submarine of the United States Navy

Other uses 
 40S ribosomal protein S18
 County Route S18 (California), United States
 S18: Handle and open container with care, a safety phrase
 S-18 85 mm gun, a Soviet tank gun
 S18, a postcode district in Dronfield, England